The Argo JM19, and its derivatives/evolutions, the Argo JM19C, and the Argo JM19D, are a series of IMSA GTP Lights/Group C2 sports prototype, designed, developed, and built by British constructor Argo Racing Cars, for the IMSA GT Championship, introduced in 1985. Its use in sports car racing continued into the early 1990s. It won a total of 7 races, and scored a total of 21 podium finishes. It was powered by a number of different engines, including a Mazda 13B rotary engine, a Buick V6 turbo engine, a Ferrari V8 engine, and even a Ford-Cosworth DFL V8 Formula One-derived engine. It did, however, find most of its success when equipped with the Mazda-powered Wankel rotary engines.

References

Sports prototypes
Argo Racing Cars
IMSA GTP cars
Group C cars